Paremhat 9 - Coptic Calendar - Paremhat 11

The tenth day of the Coptic month of Paremhat, the seventh month of the Coptic year. In common years, this day corresponds to March 6, of the Julian Calendar, and March 19, of the Gregorian Calendar. This day falls in the Coptic Season of Shemu, the season of the Harvest. On this day, the coptic Church celebrates second Feast of the cross, commemorating the appearation of the Cross to Emperor Constantine.

Commemorations

Feasts 

 Second Feast of the Cross

References 

Days of the Coptic calendar